Acacia petraea, commonly known as lancewood, is a shrub or tree belonging to the genus Acacia and the subgenus Juliflorae that is native to north eastern Australia.

Description
It has grey-brown coloured and longitudinally stringy bark and angular yellow-brown to purplish brown branchlets that are lightly haired when young but later become glabrous. Like most species of Acacia it has phyllodes rather than true leaves. The phyllodes taper to a point and are inconspicuously multistriate with a barely discernible midnerve and eight to ten minor nerves per millimetre. It blooms between May and September producing golden flowers.

Taxonomy
The specific epithet is in reference to the rocky habitat in which the species is found.

Distribution
It is endemic to south western parts of Queensland on and around the Grey Range where it is often situated on lateritic scarps and ridge-tops growing in rocky soils as a part of savannah, heath or open woodland communities. The distribution is quite fragmented with outlying populations found in the Gregory South and Warrego districts and near the border with New South Wales.

See also
List of Acacia species

References

petraea
Flora of Queensland
Taxa named by Leslie Pedley
Plants described in 1974